The Redbrook Incline Bridge is a nineteenth-century tramway bridge that crosses the B4231 road at Redbrook on the England–Wales border. The bridge straddles the border and stands in the counties of Monmouthshire in Wales and Gloucestershire in England.  It was built as a branch line from the Monmouth Tramroad to transport coal to the Redbrook Tinplate Works and was constructed on a significant incline as a consequence of its standing well below the main tramway. It is a remarkable survival of 19th-century industrialisation in the Wye Valley and is both a Grade II* and a Grade II listed structure, and a scheduled monument.

History and description
The Monmouth Tramroad was a horse-drawn railway between Monmouth and Coleford in Gloucestershire. It opened in 1812 and closed in the late 19th century. The Redbrook Incline Bridge was constructed as part of a branch line from the main tramroad to serve the Redbrook Tinplate Works. Grace's Guide to British Industrial History suggests it was also used to transport coal out of the Forest of Dean to the River Wye for onward transportation.

The bridge is constructed of Old Red Sandstone, and forms a single arch, approximately 3.25 metres high, over the B4231 Road. The bridge is 6 metres wide, with high parapets, the width indicating its function as a self-acting incline bridge, with two parallel rails running its length.

The bridge is listed at Grade II* by Cadw and at Grade II by Historic England. It is also a scheduled monument.

Notes

References

Grade II* listed bridges in England
Grade II listed bridges in Wales
Bridges in Monmouthshire
Grade II* listed buildings in Monmouthshire
Scheduled monuments in Monmouthshire
Grade II listed bridges
Bridges in Gloucestershire
Grade II listed buildings in Gloucestershire